Mladé Buky is a market town in Trutnov District in the Hradec Králové Region of the Czech Republic. It has about 2,300 inhabitants. It lies on the Úpa River.

Administrative parts
Villages of Hertvíkovice, Kalná Voda and Sklenářovice are administrative parts of Mladé Buky.

References

Market towns in the Czech Republic